Peraleda de la Mata is a municipality located in the province of Cáceres, Extremadura, Spain. According to the 2014 census, the municipality has a population of 1420 inhabitants.

Location 
It is situated in the province limit between Cáceres and Toledo, at about 170 km of Madrid and is accessed from (A-5) highway.

Local economy 
The base of the economy is agricultural and livestock, dominated by the sheep. Recently, people have driven modernization with the creation of a large industrial park adjacent to the A-5.

Main sights 
 Dolmen of Guadalperal

References

External links

Municipalities in the Province of Cáceres